Clair Carlton Criss (10 April 1879 – 9 March 1952) was an American businessman who developed the insurance company Mutual Benefit Health and Accident Association, later to become Mutual of Omaha. Under his leadership it grew from having 300 policyholders to become the largest company in the world that exclusively sold health and disability insurance.

Early years

Clair Carlton Criss was born and raised in Sac City, Iowa.
He was born on 10 April 1879, son of James Lewis Criss (1846–1918) and Sevilla M. Wodell Criss (1853–1924).
He was the oldest of four children.
Mabel Leone Chambers (1881–1978) was born in Cedar Rapids, Iowa, and moved several times.
She went to high school in Pender, Thurston County, Nebraska.

Clair and Mabel married in 1901 in Wayne, Nebraska.
They lived in Bloomfield, Nebraska where Clair managed a clothing store owned by his father.
They had one child, Harry Mantz Criss (1902–1907).
Their son, who had always been sickly, died of a blood infection in Bloomfield.
In 1908 the Crisses moved to Omaha.
Clair studied medicine at the Creighton University medical school and graduated in 1912.
To pay for his education he sold insurance.

Origins of Mutual Benefit

The Mutual Benefit Health and Accident Association was founded in 1909 with a charter to sell insurance in Nebraska.
By 1910 it had less than 300 insurance policies and was making few sales.
At that time Mabel Criss was working as an independent stenographer for the company, while Clair Criss was studying at Creighton University and selling health and accident policies for another company.
The founders asked Clair Criss for advice, and he told them to make their policies simpler, with broader coverage.
When they hesitated to take this advice, the Crisses offered to buy the company for $300, which was accepted.
Clair Criss completed his medical degree at Creighton University while the couple ran the insurance company.
Clair took care of sales while Mabel ran the office.

Growth

After practicing medicine for one year, Criss devoted all his energies to the company.
Clair introduced innovations that other companies did not offer.
The company sold health care policies that were not limited to fixed periods, and provided lifetime disability coverage for ordinary people.
Clair joined community organizations such as Knights of Ak-Sar-Ben, the Benevolent and Protective Order of Elks and the Omaha Chamber of Commerce.
Criss was elected president of Mutual Benefit Health and Accident Association in 1933.
During his tenure Mutual Benefit became the largest company exclusively offering health and accident insurance.
United Benefit Fire Insurance Company was formed in March 1947, with Criss as president.

Criss retired on 10 April 1949.
On his retirement Criss was named chairman of Mutual Benefit and of its subsidiary United Benefit Life Insurance Company.
V. J. Skutt succeeded Criss as president of Mutual Benefit.
He renamed the company "Mutual of Omaha".
Criss died at home in Omaha of a heart attack on 9 March 1952 after three years of poor health.
He was chairman of the boards of directors of Campanion Companies, Mutual Benefit and United Benefit.

Legacy

Criss was buried in Forest Lawn Memorial Park, Omaha.
After his death Mabel donated $7 million that, supplemented by federal grants and loans, was used to develop the Dr. C.C. and Mabel L. Criss Health Sciences Center at Creighton University
The Criss's are also remembered by their names on the Dr. C.C. and Mabel L. Criss Library at the University of Nebraska Omaha and a seminar center in the University of Nebraska Medical Center's Durham Research Center.
The Dr. C.C. and Mabel L. Criss Memorial Foundation is active and makes grants, but avoids publicity.

Notes

Sources

1879 births
1952 deaths
Businesspeople from Omaha, Nebraska